Crno is a village in the Novi Vinodolski municipality, Croatia. As of the 2011 census, there was only 1 person living in the village.

References

Populated places in Primorje-Gorski Kotar County